The Roman Catholic Archdiocese of Concepción is an archdiocese located in the city of Concepción in Chile.

History
 22 March 1563: Established as Diocese of La Imperial from the Diocese of Santiago de Chile
 1603: Renamed as Diocese of Concepción
 20 May 1939: Promoted as Metropolitan Archdiocese of Concepción

Ordinaries

Diocese of La Imperial
Erected: 22 March 1563
Antonio Avendaño y Paz, O.F.M. (22 Mar 1564 – 9 Mar 1588 Appointed, Bishop of Quito)
Agustín de Cisneros Montesa (9 Mar 1589 – 1596 Died)
Reginaldo de Lizárraga, O.P. (31 Aug 1598 – 20 Jul 1609 Appointed, Bishop of Paraguay)

Diocese of Concepción
Renamed: 1603
Carlos Marcelo Corni Velazquez (18 Oct 1618 – 17 Aug 1620 Appointed, Bishop of Trujillo)
Luis Jerónimo Oré, O.F.M. (17 Aug 1620 – 30 Jan 1630 Died)
Diego de Zambrana de Villalobos y Cordero (14 Mar 1633 – 12 Dec 1652 Died)
Dionisio de Cimbrón, O. Cist. (23 Jun 1653 – 19 Sep 1661 Died)
Francisco de Loyola y Vergara, O.S.A. (15 Jul 1669 – Nov 1677 Died)
Antonio de Morales, O.P. (25 May 1682 – Dec 1683 Died)
Luis de Lemos y Usategui, O.S.A. (16 Sep 1686 – 27 Nov 1692 Resigned)
Martín de Híjar y Mendoza, O.S.A. (13 Apr 1693 – 15 May 1704 Died)
Diego Montero del Aguila (3 Oct 1708 – 21 Jan 1715 Appointed, Bishop of Trujillo)
Juan de Necolalde (1 Apr 1715 – 12 May 1723 Appointed, Archbishop of La Plata o Charcas)
Juan Francisco Antonio de Escandón, C.R. (12 May 1723 – 18 Jun 1731 Appointed, Archbishop of Lima)
Salvador Bermúdez y Becerra (18 Jun 1731 – 28 Feb 1734 Confirmed, Bishop of La Paz)
Andrés Paredes Polanco y Armendáriz (28 Feb 1734- 28 Feb 1735, became Bishop of Quito)
Pedro Felipe de Azúa e Iturgoyen (28 Feb 1735 – 18 Dec 1744 Confirmed, Archbishop of Santafé en Nueva Granada)
José de Toro y Zambrano (18 Dec 1744 – 1 May 1760 Died)
Pedro Ángel de Espiñeira, O.F.M. (23 Nov 1761 – 9 Feb 1778 Died)
Francisco José Marán (1 Mar 1779 – 12 Sep 1794 Appointed, Bishop of Santiago de Chile)
Tomás de Roa y Alarcón (12 Sep 1794 – 5 Sep 1805 Died)
Diego Antonio Navarro Martín de Villodras (26 Aug 1806 – 16 Mar 1818 Confirmed, Archbishop of La Plata o Charcas)
José Ignacio Cienfuegos Arteaga (17 Dec 1832 – 27 Apr 1840 Retired)
Diego Antonio Elizondo y Prado (27 Apr 1840 – 5 Oct 1852 Died)
José Hipólito Salas y Toro (23 Jun 1854 – 20 Jul 1883 Died)
Fernando Blaitt Mariño (17 Dec 1886 – 14 Jul 1887 Died)
Plácido Labarca Olivares (26 Jun 1890 – 9 Oct 1905 Died)
Luis Enrique Izquierdo Vargas (29 Jan 1906 – 7 Aug 1917 Died)
Gilberto Fuenzalida Guzmán (20 Feb 1918 – 24 Mar 1938 Died)

Archdiocese of Concepción
Elevated: 20 May 1939
Alfredo Silva Santiago (4 Feb 1939 – 27 Apr 1963 Resigned)
Manuel Sánchez Beguiristáin (25 Jun 1963 – 3 May 1983 Retired)
José Manuel Santos Ascarza, O.C.D. (3 May 1983 – 29 Jul 1988 Resigned)
Antonio Moreno Casamitjana (14 Oct 1989 – 27 Dec 2006 Retired)
Ricardo Ezzati Andrello, S.D.B. (27 Dec 2006 – 15 Dec 2010 Appointed, Archbishop of Santiago de Chile; Cardinal in 2014)
Fernando Natalio Chomalí Garib (20 Apr 2011 Appointed – )

Other affiliated bishops

Coadjutor archbishop
Arturo Mery Beckdorf (1955-1963), did not succeed to see; appointed Coadjutor Archbishop of La Serena

Auxiliary bishops
Pedro Felipe de Azúa e Iturgoyen (1735-1742), appointed Bishop here
Carlos Oviedo Cavada, O. de M. (1964-1974), appointed Archbishop of Antofagasta; future Cardinal
Sergio Otoniel Contreras Navia (1974-1977), appointed Bishop of Temuco
Alejandro Goić Karmelić (1979-1991), appointed	Auxiliary Bishop of Talca
Pedro Felipe Bacarreza Rodríguez (1991-2006), appointed Bishop of Los Angeles
Tomislav Koljatic Maroevic (1997-2003), appointed Bishop of Linares
Pedro Mario Ossandón Buljevic (2008-2011), appointed Auxiliary Bishop of Santiago de Chile

Other priests of this diocese who became bishops
Alonso del Pozo y Silva, appointed Bishop of Córdoba (Tucumán), Argentina in 1713
José Antonio Humeres y Miranda, appointed Bishop of Panamá in 1777
Andrés Quintian Ponte de Andrade, appointed Bishop of Cuenca, Ecuador in 1805
Ricardo Sepúlveda Hermosilla, appointed Vicar General of Temuco in 1908 (titular bishop in 1911)
Reinaldo Muñoz Olave, appointed Vicar General of Chillán  (and titular bishop) in 1916

Suffragan dioceses
 San Bartolomé de Chillán
 Santa Maria de Los Ángeles
 Temuco
 Valdivia
 Villarrica

References

Sources
 GCatholic.org
 Catholic Hierarchy
 Diocese website

Roman Catholic dioceses in Chile
Religious organizations established in the 1560s
Roman Catholic dioceses established in the 16th century
 
Roman Catholic ecclesiastical provinces in Chile
1563 establishments in the Captaincy General of Chile